Provença is the name of a Ferrocarrils de la Generalitat de Catalunya station located under Avinguda Diagonal and Balmes street. The station is served by FGC-operated Barcelona Metro lines L6 and L7, and Metro del Vallès suburban metro lines S1 and S2. Diagonal is the name of an important station in TMB-operated Barcelona Metro network. It is named after Avinguda Diagonal, where the station is located together with Passeig de Gràcia. It is served by TMB-operated Barcelona Metro lines L3 and L5, and it is also connected with FGC station.

History

FGC
The Ferrocarrils de la Generalitat de Catalunya station was opened in 1882 and in this moment it was not an underground station, but it was located on the same place. In 1929, the current station was opened, under Balmes street and between Provença and Rosselló streets. Currently, it has two accesses from the street, one at each side of the station. In 1995, the hall was extended and some elevators were installed. This hall has some ticket vending machines and some shops. The Rosselló access was opened in 1970 to connect with TMB-operated Barcelona Metro stations and was extended and modernized in 2008.

Barcelona Metro
 Barcelona Metro line 3 station was opened in 1924 with the opening of the line between Catalunya and Lesseps, the first metropolitan railway line in the city. The station is located under Passeig de Gràcia between Rosselló street and Avinguda Diagonal and has two halls, one at each side of the station. It exists a corridor used to connect with Barcelona Metro line 5 station and FGC metro station.
 Barcelona Metro line 5 station was opened in 1969 with the opening of the line between this station and Collblanc. The station is located under Rosselló street, near Rambla Catalunya. It has two halls, one at each side of the station and they are equipped with some ticket vending machines, a TMB information center and a bar. There are two long corridors, one to connect with Barcelona Metro line 3 station and the other one to connect with FGC metro station.

Gallery

External links

Ferrocarrils de la Generalitat de Catalunya
Information about L3 metro station at TMB
Information about L5 metro station at TMB
Transports Metropolitans de Barcelona
Information about FGC station at Trenscat.com
Information about L3 metro station at Trenscat.com
Information about L5 metro station at Trenscat.com
Diagonal L3, history and antique photos at Transport.cat

Stations on the Barcelona–Vallès Line
Barcelona Metro line 3 stations
Barcelona Metro line 5 stations
Barcelona Metro line 6 stations
Barcelona Metro line 7 stations
Transport in Eixample
Avinguda Diagonal
Railway stations located underground in Spain
Railway stations in Spain opened in 1882
Railway stations in Spain opened in 1924
Railway stations in Spain opened in 1969